Delray Beach station is a train station in Delray Beach, Florida, that is served by Tri-Rail and Amtrak. It is located on South Congress Avenue (SR 807), south of West Atlantic Avenue (SR 806) and east of State Road 9.

The station officially opened in 1991 after legal squabbles and poor access led Tri-Rail to abandon the historic former Seaboard Air Line Railway depot located a few blocks north. Amtrak, which had also been using the old Seaboard depot, moved to the station in 1995. Its Silver Meteor and Silver Star stop at the station, which was remodeled between 2004 and 2006 to accommodate a second track.

Station layout
The station has two side platforms, with parking and a bus loop to the west of the southbound platform.

References

External links

South Florida Regional Transportation Authority – Delray Beach station
Delray Beach Amtrak/Tri-Rail Station  (USA Rail Guide – TrainWeb)

Tri-Rail stations in Palm Beach County, Florida
Amtrak stations in Florida
Railway stations in the United States opened in 1991
Delray Beach, Florida
1991 establishments in Florida